Mukku Kasi Reddy is an Indian politician from Kanigiri constituency of Andhra Pradesh. He has started his political career in 1983 as a Member of the Legislative Assembly (India) from Telugu Desam Party and served as Sericulture Minister in NTR’s first Cabinet. He has represented Kanigiri constituency as a Member of the Legislative Assembly (India) 3 times in 1983, 1985, 1994. In 2001, he has won the Zilla Parishad Election and served as ZP Chairman for Prakasam District until 2006. In 2009, he quit the Telugu Desam Party.

In 2010, he joined YSR Congress Party headed by Y.S Jagan Mohan Reddy.

References 

Telugu politicians
Andhra Pradesh MLAs 1983–1985
Andhra Pradesh MLAs 1985–1989
Year of birth missing (living people)
Living people
Andhra Pradesh MLAs 1999–2004
Telugu Desam Party politicians
YSR Congress Party politicians
Andhra Pradesh MLAs 1994–1999